Ternstroemia is a genus of flowering plants in the family Pentaphylacaceae. It is distributed in tropical and subtropical regions in Africa, Asia, and the Americas.

These are evergreen shrubs and trees. The leaves are alternately arranged, sometimes in clusters. Species are androdioecious, with some individuals bearing bisexual flowers and others with flowers that are functionally male. Flowers are solitary or borne in clusters. The flower has two bracteoles, five sepals, five petals, and many stamens. The berry-like fruit contains seeds that have red flesh over a thick endosperm. They are likely dispersed by birds.

T. gymnanthera is an Asian species cultivated as an ornamental plant. T. pringlei is one of the most widely used medicinal plants in Mexico.

The genus was named in honour of Christopher Tärnström. There are about 90 species in the genus.

Species include:

 Ternstroemia bullata Proctor
 Ternstroemia calycina Fawc. & Rendle
 Ternstroemia cherreyi
 Ternstroemia cleistogama Kobuski
 Ternstroemia corneri H.Keng
 Ternstroemia evenia (King) A.C.Sm.
 Ternstroemia glomerata Proctor
 Ternstroemia granulata Krug & Urb.
 Ternstroemia gymnanthera (Wight & Arn.) Sprague – Japanese ternstoemia, cleyera
 Ternstroemia heptasepala – saintedwood
 Ternstroemia howardiana Kobuski
 Ternstroemia landae Standl. & L.O.Williams
 Ternstroemia lineata DC.
 Ternstroemia luquillensis Krug & Urb. – palo colorado
 Ternstroemia maclellandiana Ridl.
 Ternstroemia peduncularis – copey vera
 Ternstroemia penangiana Choisy
 Ternstroemia polypetala Melch.
 Ternstroemia selleana Ekman & Schmidt
 Ternstroemia stahlii – mamey de cura
 Ternstroemia subsessilis (Britt.) Kobuski – el yunque colorado
 Ternstroemia tepezapote
 Ternstroemia wallichiana (Griffith) Engl.

References

 
Ericales genera
Taxonomy articles created by Polbot